Jumba may refer to:

 Jumba la Mtwana, a former slave port on the Indian Ocean coast of Kenya
 Jumba Jookiba, a fictional alien character from the 2002 Disney film Lilo & Stitch and its franchise
 Jumbah, a blue Boohbah in a children's television show
 KevJumba (born 1990), YouTube celebrity